Rincón de Soto is a village in the province and autonomous community of La Rioja, Spain.

Notable people
Juan Antonio Llorente
Fernando Llorente
Rubén Pardo

References

Populated places in La Rioja (Spain)